Eddie Williams (born August 22, 1987) is a former American football fullback. He is also the lead teaching pastor at DOXA Church in Redmond, Washington. He was drafted by the Washington Redskins in the seventh round of the 2009 NFL Draft. He played college football at University of Idaho.

He was also a member of the Chicago Bears and Seattle Seahawks.

College career
Williams was a first-team All-WAC selection in 2008, and a SI.com honorable mention All-American. Williams is Idaho's 1-A all-time Tight-ends single-season receptions leader with 54. He also attended the NFL Scouting Combine in February 2009.

Professional career

Washington Redskins
Williams was drafted by the Washington Redskins in the seventh round of the 2009 NFL Draft. He was waived by the Redskins on September 5, 2009. He was then signed to the practice squad. Williams was activated to the Redskins' 53-man roster on November 2.

After the 2009 season, Williams was released by the team on March 4, 2010.

Chicago Bears
On March 10, 2010, Williams was signed by the Chicago Bears. He was waived on September 4, but signed to the Bears' practice squad the next day.

Williams was waived on September 2, 2011 before the start of the 2011 season.

Cleveland Browns
Williams was signed to the practice squad of the Cleveland Browns on September 7, 2011.

Seattle Seahawks
Williams was signed off the Browns' practice squad by the Seattle Seahawks on September 13. He started 6 games.

Second Stint with Browns
Williams was re-signed to the Browns' on November 8, 2011. He was promoted to the active roster on December 16 and started the remaining 3 games of the 2011 season.

On August 14, 2012, Williams was waived-injured by the team. After not being claimed off waivers, he was put on the team's injured reserve list. Eddie competed in the 2013 season, playing in 16 games and starting 6.

Speaking career
Williams speaks for business and organizations.

Personal life
Williams is married with four children, and currently works as the lead teaching pastor of DOXA Church in Redmond, Washington.

References

External links
Cleveland Browns bio 
eddiejwilliams.com
Bay City Church website

1987 births
Living people
Players of American football from California
American football fullbacks
American football tight ends
Coffeyville Red Ravens football players
Idaho Vandals football players
People from San Mateo, California
Washington Redskins players
Chicago Bears players
Cleveland Browns players
Seattle Seahawks players
Sportspeople from the San Francisco Bay Area